Arabic musical instruments can be broadly classified into three categories: string instruments (chordophones), wind instruments (aerophones), and percussion instruments. They evolved from ancient civilizations in the region.

Chordophones

Plucked lutes
Oud 
Qanbūs
Buzuq
Awtar
Lutar
Sintir
Tez kara

Zithers
Qanun
Iraqi Santur

Bowed lutes
Jawzah
Ghuanbri
Kamancheh
Rababa
Pontic lyra

Lyres
Simsimiyya
Kissar
Tanbūra
Jewish Lyre

Aerophones

Flutes
Ney
Kawalah
Salamiyah
Minjayrah
Shababah
Shakuli
Furayrah
Kasab
bilspleet fluit

Reed instruments
Mizmar
Khalul (Gulfian Mizmar)
Ghayta 
Arghul
Zumarah bi suwan
Maqrunah
Mijwiz
Haban (Gulfian Bagpipe)
Jirbah (East Tunisian Bagpipe)
Mizwad (West Tunisian Bagpipe)
Zughra (Moroccan Bagpipe)
Saksifun (Arabic Saxophone)

Trumpets
Nafir
balzak

Percussion instruments

Drums and frame drums

Riq
Daf
Bendir
Dumbaki
Duhulah
Drinjah
Bass Drinjah
Khishbah
Kasurah
Tabl Tsjikangha
Tabl Masanduw
Tabl Bib
Taarija
Tar
Tar Barashim (Shake Tar)
Tar Mirjaf (Low Tar)
Tar Saghul (High Tar)
Katim
Mirwas
Zir (Naqarah)
Qas'ah
Tbilat
Tabl Bahri (Khamari & Laauwb)
Tabl Hajir (Khamari & Laauwb)
Tabl Nasayfi (Khamari & Laauwb)
Al Ras
Mazhar

Other percussion
Shakhshikhah (Sistrum)
Sajat
Turah (Egyptian Sajat)
Twaysat (Gulf Sajat)
Krakebs
Hawan
Yahalah/Jahalah (Clay jug)
Manjur
Mihbaj
Maalaqa
Safqa (Arabic hand clap)

Arabic musical instruments
Lists of musical instruments